TSS St Andrew was a passenger vessel built for the Great Western Railway in 1931.

History

TSS St Andrew was built by Cammell Laird at Birkenhead as one of a pair of new passenger vessels, the other being TSS St David, and launched in November 1931.

She was set to work on the Fishguard to Rosslare service in replacement of her namesake St Andrew of 1908.

She was requisitioned by the Admiralty in the Second World War as a hospital ship, taking part in the evacuation of Dunkirk in 1940. She returned to the Fishguard to Rosslare service in 1946 and continued in service until 1967 when she was scrapped.

References

1931 ships
Passenger ships of the United Kingdom
Steamships of the United Kingdom
Ships built on the River Mersey
Ships of the Great Western Railway
Ships of British Rail